Steven William Kealey (born May 13, 1947 in Torrance, California) is a former Major League Baseball pitcher for the California Angels and Chicago White Sox from 1968 to 1973. Kealey had been the most recent White Sox pitcher to hit a home run in a game until Jon Garland hit one in a game against the Cincinnati Reds on June 18, 2006.

The ,  Kealey appeared in 139 Major League games, four as a starting pitcher. He had one complete game, one shutout, 11 saves and 126 strikeouts in 214⅓ innings pitched, allowing 219 hits and 69 bases on balls.

External links

Living people
1947 births
Chicago White Sox players
California Angels players
Baseball players from California
Major League Baseball pitchers
Hawaii Islanders players
Idaho Falls Angels players
Quad Cities Angels players
El Paso Sun Kings players
Iowa Oaks players
Indianapolis Indians players